Molossus is a genus of bats. The genus contains ten species with a New World distribution from Mexico in the north to northern Argentina at its most southerly limit. Four of these species have distributions that include various islands in the West Indies such as Puerto Rico or Trinidad.

The genus belongs to a group commonly referred to as free-tailed bats. Its name is from the ancient Molossus breed of shepherd dog.

Systematics
The following species are recognised:

 Molossus alvarezi
 Molossus aztecus Saussure, 1860
Molossus barnesi
 Molossus coibensis Allen, 1904
 Molossus currentium Thomas, 1901
 Molossus molossus (Pallas, 1766)
 Molossus pretiosus Miller, 1902
 Molossus rufus E. Geoffroy, 1805
 Molossus sinaloae

References

Bibliography

 
Bat genera
Taxa named by Étienne Geoffroy Saint-Hilaire